Foel Cedig is a Marilyn on the Gwynedd/ Powys border in north Wales. In 2018 it replaced Cyrniau Nod as the Marilyn for this area.

It is located a very short distance from Cyrniau Nod. This has led to peak baggers having to recomplete.

References

Marilyns of Wales
Mountains and hills of Snowdonia
Mountains and hills of Powys
Mountains and hills of Gwynedd